The 1969 Major League Baseball All-Star Game was the 40th midseason exhibition between the all-stars of the American League (AL) and the National League (NL), the two leagues comprising Major League Baseball. The game was played in the afternoon on Wednesday, July 23, at Robert F. Kennedy Memorial Stadium in Washington, D.C. and resulted in a 9–3 victory for the National League. Steve Carlton was the winning pitcher while Mel Stottlemyre was the losing pitcher.

The game was originally scheduled for the evening of Tuesday, July 22, but heavy rains forced its postponement to the following afternoon. The 1969 contest remains the last All-Star Game to date to be played earlier than prime time in the Eastern United States.

President Richard Nixon originally planned to attend the Tuesday night game and throw out the first ball, and then depart for the splashdown of Apollo 11 in the Pacific Ocean. But with the game's postponement until Wednesday afternoon, Nixon missed the game altogether and Vice President Spiro Agnew attended instead.

Game summary
After scoring in the first inning on an error, the National League made it 3–0 in the second inning against AL starter Mel Stottlemyre on a two-run homer by Reds' catcher Johnny Bench. Denny McLain was scheduled as the American League starter, but was late arriving to the stadium (via his own airplane) and pitched later in the game.

Five more runs came across for the NL in the third inning, Blue Moon Odom of Oakland surrendering all. Willie McCovey's two-run homer and back-to-back doubles by Félix Millán and pitcher Steve Carlton were the key blows.

McCovey added another home run in the fourth, and was voted the game's most valuable player.

Starting lineup

Reserves

American League

Pitchers

Position players

National League

Pitchers

Position players

Umpires

Line score

References

External links
 1969 All-Star Game summary @baseball-almanac.com
 1969 All-Star Game box score @baseball-almanac.com
 1969 All-Star Game play-by-play @baseball-almanac.com
 1969 All-Star Game results @mlb.com
 Baseball Reference 1969 All-Star Game review @ baseball-reference.com

All-Star Game
1969
Baseball in Washington, D.C.
Major League Baseball All Star Game
Major League Baseball All-Star Game
1969